Kesra is a town and commune in the Siliana Governorate, Tunisia. As of 2004 it had a population of 2,490. In 2014 this was 2600.
Kesra is in Siliana Governorate near Maktar at 35.8N and 9.36e. The town is at altitude of 966m and is near the Jebel Serj national park.
During the Roman Empire Kesra was a civitas of the Roman Province of Byzacena called Cusira.

A flat bread made of Semolina is also called Kesra in north Africa.

See also
List of cities in Tunisia

References

Populated places in Tunisia
Communes of Tunisia